Burton Armus (born December 11, 1934 in New York City, New York) is an American police officer, actor, writer and television producer. Armus' Hollywood career began when, while he was still serving as an NYPD detective assigned to the 48th Squad in the Bronx, he was hired to be the technical advisor on the TV series N.Y.P.D. in 1967. He also wrote the episode "Boys Night Out" for that series.  Later, still a serving detective, he was picked by Telly Savalas to act as a technical adviser on the Kojak series. He also acted in three of the episodes, and wrote nine of them. Following his retirement from the police department he moved to Los Angeles and became a successful writer and producer. He is now retired from this second career. Director Richard Donner, who directed three episodes of Kojak, named a detective in his blockbuster film Superman after Armus.

Awards
In 1994, Armus won a Humanitas Prize for 60 Minute Category (NYPD Blue; 1993), which was shared with David Milch. He received two Emmy Award nominations that same year, one for Outstanding Individual Achievement in Writing in a Drama Series (NYPD Blue) and the other for Outstanding Drama Series (NYPD Blue). He garnered another Emmy nomination in 1995, for Outstanding Drama Series (NYPD Blue).

Filmography

Actor
Kojak (Three episodes)
Inside Moves

Writer
Tarzan - The Epic Adventures (pilot episode)
Airwolf (Three episodes)
Star Trek: The Next Generation (Two episodes)
NYPD Blue (Six episodes)
Street Hawk (One episode)
The New Dragnet (Eight episodes)
The New Adam-12 (Eight episodes)
The Fall Guy (Two episodes)
Cassie & Company (Three episodes)
Paris (One episode)
CHiPs (One episode)
Policewoman (Two episodes)
Kojak (Nine episodes)
N.Y.P.D. (One episode)

Producer
The New Adam-12 (20 episodes)
The New Dragnet (26 episodes)
Airwolf (1st Season)
Star Trek: The Next Generation
NYPD Blue
Knight Rider

Technical Advisor
N.Y.P.D. (four episodes)
Delvecchio (four episodes)
Kojak (Ninety-five episodes)

References

External links

Living people
American soap opera writers
American male television writers
1934 births